Rade Mijatović (born 30 June 1981) is a Montenegrin handball player.

Club career
Over the course of his career, Mijatović played for Vojvodina, Partizan, Altea, Crvena zvezda, Teka Cantabria, Alcobendas, Toledo, Antequera, Dinamo Minsk, Metalurg Skopje, Csurgói KK, Tatabánya, Meshkov Brest and Ferencváros.

International career
At international level, Mijatović represented Montenegro in five major tournaments, including four European Championships.

Honours
Vojvodina
 Serbia and Montenegro Handball Super League: 2004–05
 Serbia and Montenegro Handball Cup: 2004–05
Dinamo Minsk
 Belarusian Men's Handball Championship: 2012–13
Metalurg Skopje
 Macedonian Handball Super League: 2013–14
Meshkov Brest
 Belarusian Men's Handball Championship: 2016–17, 2017–18
 Belarusian Men's Handball Cup: 2016–17, 2017–18

References

External links

 EHF record
 MKSZ record

1981 births
Living people
Sportspeople from Sombor
Serbian people of Montenegrin descent
Montenegrin male handball players
RK Vojvodina players
RK Partizan players
RK Crvena zvezda players
CB Cantabria players
Liga ASOBAL players
Expatriate handball players
Montenegrin expatriate sportspeople in Spain
Montenegrin expatriate sportspeople in Belarus
Montenegrin expatriate sportspeople in North Macedonia
Montenegrin expatriate sportspeople in Hungary